Klineman is a surname derived from its German equivalent Kleinman, meaning "small man". Notable people with the surname include:
Alix Klineman (born 1989), American volleyball player
Hedy Klineman, American painter
Kent Klineman, actor and musician

References